is the sixth single by the Japanese idol girl group Nogizaka46. It reached the number one slot on the Oricon Singles Chart. It also reached number one on the Billboard Japan Hot 100. It was the 13th best-selling single in Japan in 2013, with 452,310 copies. The coupling song "Sekai de Ichiban Kodoku na Lover" was used as a featured song for NTV's night drama Bad Boys J and its live action film.

Release 
This single was released in 4 versions. Type-A, Type-B, Type-C and a regular edition. The center position in the choreography for the title song is held by Mai Shiraishi.

Track listing

Type-A

Type-B

Type-C

Regular Edition

Participating members

Girls’ Rule
Centre: Mai Shiraishi

3rd Row: Marika Itō, Sayuri Inoue, Kana Nakada, Yumi Wakatsuki, Minami Hoshino, Manatsu Akimoto, Mai Fukagawa, Yūri Saitō 

2nd Row: Reika Sakurai, Erika Ikuta, Rina Ikoma, Nanase Nishino, Kazumi Takayama

1st Row: Sayuri Matsumura, Mai Shiraishi , Nanami Hashimoto

Chart and certifications

Weekly charts

Year-end charts

Certifications

References

Further reading

External links
 Discography on Nogizaka46 Official Website 
 
 
 
 

2013 songs
2013 singles
Japanese-language songs
Nogizaka46 songs
Oricon Weekly number-one singles